Paradise Canyon is a 1935 Western film starring John Wayne, directed by Carl L. Pierson.  The film was Wayne's final Monogram Pictures/Lone Star Production Western. The film was released years later in a colorized version on home video/dvd under the title Guns Along the Trail.

Plot
John Wyatt is a government agent sent to smash a counterfeiting operation near the Mexican border. Joining Doc Carter's medicine show, they arrive in the town where Curly Joe, who once framed Carter, resides. Learning that Curly Joe is the counterfeiter, Wyatt goes after the man himself.

Cast
 John Wayne as John Wyatt
 Marion Burns as Linda Carter aka Princess Natasha
 Reed Howes as Henchman Red
 Earle Hodgins as Doc Carter
 Gino Corrado as Rurales Captain
 Yakima Canutt as Curly Joe Gale
 Gordon Clifford as Mike – singer, Texas Two
 Perry Murdock as Ike – singer, Texas Two
 Earl Dwire (uncredited) as the second Sheriff

Colorization
In 2008, Legend Films colorized and renamed the film as Guns Along The Trail, for a DVD collection that features several other "Poverty Row" era John Wayne films.

See also
 John Wayne filmography

References

External links
 
 
 
 
 
 

1935 films
American black-and-white films
1935 Western (genre) films
1930s English-language films
Monogram Pictures films
American Western (genre) films
Films directed by Robert Emmett Tansey
1930s American films